Taşdemir is a Turkish surname and may refer to:

 Anıl Taşdemir (born 1988), Turkish footballer 
 Dirayet Taşdemir, Turkish politician
 Emre Taşdemir (born 1995), Turkish professional footballer 
 Tayfun Taşdemir (born 1975), Turkish professional carom billiards player

Turkish-language surnames